Songs My Mother Taught Me an autobiography by Marlon Brando with Robert Lindsey as co-author, published by Random House in 1994.

The book deals with Brando's childhood, his memories of being a struggling actor and of his early relationships with family members and later with other actors, producers, and directors. He talks candidly about his sex life; but, notably, he shares relatively few details about his wives or children. Reportedly, the omission of details about his experiences as a husband and father was one of Brando's conditions for agreeing to submit his manuscript to the publisher, who paid the actor over a million dollars for the work. He does, though, recount his encounters with and impressions of such notable figures as Marilyn Monroe, Laurence Olivier, Vivien Leigh, David Niven, Richard Burton, Elizabeth Taylor, John F. Kennedy, John Huston, and many others. He also describes some aspects of his theatre work and films, although those descriptions tend to be succinct, characterised more by anecdotes than step-by-step descriptions of production.

The book contains Brando's comment on Jews in Hollywood, which caused considerable controversy:
The response to Brando's comments was exacerbated by an interview he gave in 1996, in which he repeated the suggestion that Hollywood was controlled by Jews.

In addition to English editions of the book, printings are available in several other languages, including Persian, a translation done by Iranian actress and director Niki Karimi in 1999.

References

1995 non-fiction books
Show business memoirs
Marlon Brando
Collaborative autobiographies